Ralph Henry Fonseca (born 9 August 1949) is a Belizean politician and a member of the People's United Party.

Political history 
In 1984, he became a candidate for the House of Representatives in Queen's Square, running against attorney and city councillor Dean Barrow. He lost and returned to private life until 1989, when he was appointed a Senator and Minister of State in Finance and Leader of Government Business in the Senate until 1993.

In 1993 elections he won in the newly created Belize Rural Central constituency despite the PUP's close overall loss. He repeated this victory in 1998 and 2003. He served in Cabinet as Minister of Budget Management, Investment and Home Affairs until 2003, when he was moved to Finance again while keeping Home Affairs. Beginning in 2006, he was in charge only of Home Affairs. He became the PUP's national campaign manager in 1985.

Fonseca was undecided as to whether he would seek a fourth term in the February 2008 election, but he subsequently decided to contest his constituency. He was defeated, in what was considered an upset, by the UDP's Michael Hutchinson, a relatively unknown candidate. On 14 February, the PUP announced that Fonesca had resigned as PUP campaign manager.

Personal life and education
Fonseca attended St. John's College High School and Sixth Form before going to university in Canada to major in information technology, specialising in systems analysis and control data. He is married with three children. Fonseca reportedly loves diving and fishing. Fonseca is a cousin of former PUP leader and Leader of the Opposition Francis Fonseca. Fonseca's younger brother, David, served as Mayor of Belize City from 1999 until 2006.

Fonseca's only son, Ralph Fonseca Jr. was killed in a motor accident on 11 September 2007.

Non-political work 
Before going to Canada, Fonseca acted as an assistant general manager at the Texaco oil company in Belize. In Canada, he was employed in various capacities of information technology. After returning to Belize, he worked as managing director for Belize Brewing Ltd., Hilllbank Agroindustries and Consolidated Electricity Services. Sandwiched between these jobs were posts as Chairman of the former Belize Electricity Board, now Belize Electricity Limited, and the Telecommunications Authority, now BTL. Presently he serves as a consultant in the petroleum, mining, airline, and shrimping industries.

Criticism 
As Minister of Finance, Fonseca popularized the policy of growth economics, which proposes to develop Belize's economy through privatization of assets and encouraging foreign investments, which in turn is supposed to create jobs for Belizeans. Supporters argue that Growth Economics is behind Belize's consecutive gains in total growth; detractors say any benefits from growth economics only accrues to PUP interests and in reality Fonseca has damaged Belize's international reputation due to high debt and poor economic indicators. He has further been accused of practicing official corruption, granting favors to party supporters in return for shares in the profits. However, claims either way cannot be measured.

Fonseca has a notably tense relationship with certain media houses antagonistic to his policies. The Amandala and KREM Radio, who under chairman Evan X Hyde had been in partnership with the PUP since 1994, claimed to have ended that relationship under pressure from Fonseca. Tropical Vision Limited Channel 7, managed by Jules Vasquez, has also come under fire by Fonseca for a perceived bias against him.

References 

1949 births
Living people
People's United Party politicians
Finance ministers of Belize
Government ministers of Belize
Members of the Senate (Belize)
Members of the Belize House of Representatives for Belize Rural Central
Belizean businesspeople